Rake Brook Reservoir is a reservoir fed by two streams, including the eponymous Rake Brook, a tributary of the River Roddlesworth in Lancashire, England.

The reservoir is adjacent to the two Roddlesworth Reservoirs. It was constructed in the 1850s by Thomas Hawksley for Liverpool Corporation Waterworks, and was designed to hold compensation water to maintain flows in the rivers, whereas the reservoirs at Lower Rivington, Upper Rivington and Anglezarke held water for the public water supply. Water from the reservoir was fed into Anglezarke reservoir by a  channel called The Goit.

The reservoir was finished in 1857, and impounded  of water when full.

Bibliography

References

West Pennine Moors
Reservoirs in Lancashire
Geography of Chorley